Proveis is a comune (municipality) in South Tyrol in northern Italy, located about  west of Bolzano.

Geography

Proveis borders the following municipalities: Cagnò, Laurein, Rumo and Ulten.

History

Coat-of-arms
The emblem represents a black grouse or square, with the sides curved  and the corners decorated with shamrock on azure. The pheasant symbolizes that the place was once famous for hunting; the four vertices represent the four original German-speaking municipalities of Non Valley: Laurein, Proveis, Unsere Liebe Frau im Walde and St. Felix, the last two united. The emblem was adopted in 1966.

Society

Linguistic distribution
According to the 2011 census, 97.71% of the population speak German and 2.29% Italian as first language.

Demographic evolution

References

External links

 Homepage of the municipality

Municipalities of South Tyrol